Acústico MTV is the second live album released by Brazilian rock band Titãs. It's part of the MTV Unplugged series and resulted in a tour, a CD, a DVD and a TV special broadcast by MTV on 22 May from that year.

The show featured various guest performances, including Argentinian singer Fito Páez on "Go Back", Marisa Monte on "Flores", Jamaican Jimmy Cliff on "Querem Meu Sangue", and ex-Titãs singer Arnaldo Antunes on "O Pulso". Páez also sings and plays the piano on the DVD version of "Televisão", while the CD version (recorded in studio) is sung by guest Rita Lee and played by also guest Roberto de Carvalho. The CD also features a short version of "Cabeça Dinossauro" sung by Marina Lima. Maria Bethânia was also expected to perform a version of "Miséria".

Conception and promotion 
Despite it having been a radio and commercial success, the band rejected the idea of it being an album conceived with commercial interests. They said creating these versions for their own songs was a challenge. As vocalist and bassist Nando Reis said, "we had to prove that Titãs could be different from Titãs and still be as good as them". They were afraid of sounding "pathetic", but were happy with growing their audience and to be back on the radio. Reis said the work was "a relief. It is very important for a band of this size to be popular. We have no underground vocation. I have no vocation to perform for half a dozen people. This does not mean to make the work mediocre". The album was also thought of as a celebration of the band's 15th anniversary.

In order to carry all musicians involved with the project from one performance to another, the band would travel on two buses. The last performances of the tour took place in 4 and 5 April 1998, at Olympia in São Paulo. These only happened after much requests from the fans, since the tour was supposed to end on 14 March at Ibirapuera Gymnasium, after 140 shows. In these last performances, the band already presented to the public their version of "É Preciso Saber Viver", a hit from their then future album Volume Dois, which they were conceiving at the time.

In 2019, amidst the band's "Trio Acústico" tour, which celebrated 20 years of Acústico MTV, Britto said the band was surprised by that time with the success of the album: "Many people bet on this idea that our songs would succeed, while others thought they wouldn't match. We ourselves had some doubts. [...] Yet, I feel that when the album came out we were surprised with the speed and the reach it had in terms of popularity. Our audience went through a radical renewal. We started playing to very young audiences and to an increasing number of women. Maybe we were the most popular group of that year, taking all genres into account."

Song information 
Apart from tracks taken from every album by the band until then (except for Tudo Ao Mesmo Tempo Agora (1991) and Domingo (1995)), the album and DVD featured four new songs: "Os Cegos do Castelo", "Nem 5 Minutos Guardados", "A Melhor Forma" and "Não Vou Lutar"; each is sung by each of the vocalists of the band's line-up at the time (respectively, Nando Reis, Sérgio Britto, Branco Mello e Paulo Miklos). "A Melhor Forma", "Nem 5 Minutos Guardados" and "Não Vou Lutar" were composed long before the album (the two former were originally planned for Õ Blésq Blom) and were resurrected for this release. Originally, only one new track would appear and the band chose "Os Cegos do Castelo"; later, however, Reis said this generated some discomfort so they decided to have one new track for each vocalist.

"Go Back" is featured in the album as a Spanish language version created by Martin Cardoso for Os Paralamas do Sucesso and to which Britto added some verses by Pablo Neruda in a spoken part. He did something similar on "Homem Primata", this time with some verses by Bob Marley. The version of "Prá Dizer Adeus" was chosen for radio airplay. In the first shows (including the ones recorded for the releases), "Bichos Escrotos" and "Polícia" consisted of short, virtually a cappella jingles by the band singing with the audience, but they eventually earned their own, full versions.

In a 2014 interview, Reis explained that, unlike what many people believed, "Os Cegos do Castelo" makes no reference to Titãs, but to his relation with cocaine: "There are subliminal messages about this topic [Reis' relation to drugs] in many other songs of mine. "Cegos no castelo" is one of them. [...] It's much about my blindness, my isolation. The castle is a place where metaphorically I encastled myself." One of the song's chord was inspired by "King Midas in Reverse", written by Graham Nash and released on the live album 4 Way Street by Crosby, Stills, Nash & Young, which Reis was listening to a lot back then.

Track listing

Reception 

The album polarized critics inside Folha de S.Paulo. Luiz Antônio Ryff considered it "great" and that the CD version manages to "preserve the energy of the show and highlight the qualities of the band's performance. Maybe the most important of all is to prove that one does not need to equip a wall of amplifiers with guitars in order to make a vigorous show." He also considered that some tracks earned versions better than the original and that "even when there is improvisations, the result is fine". However, a few months later, he would consider the acoustic shows of Os Paralamas do Sucesso better - the band would only release their Acústico MTV album in 1999.

Marcos Augusto Gonçalves said the work "resurrected" the band which "dived into a crisis that could have ended it". "More mature, more relaxed with the individual liberty acquired in the last years and willing to escape from the alley  in which they got into, the seven members of the group - who already tried a more eclectic work with "Domingo"- found in the 'unplugged' formula the way out of their difficult situation.

On the other hand, Pedro Alexandre Sanches considered Acústico MTV a pure commercial play. He deemed it "illogic" to deprive "Polícia", "Cabeça Dinossauro" and "Homem Primata" from their aggressiveness in favor of "the tackyness of the strings which ravages MPB" and to accept well versions of "Go Back" and "Comida" sung badly by "singers [...] with so little will to improve". He also criticized the version of "Go Back" for having transformed Torquato Neto's poem "into a badly pronounced and sung Spanish, using, once more, the bobo alegre Fito Paez as a pretext of transnational consecration".

Álvaro Pereira Júnior panned the album and considered it to be "the worst of 1997". He said: "Pseudo-existential dilemmas, headiness, 'deep' arrangements. The worst faults that could affect a rock band appear in great doses. [...] Titãs are a fake band, the direct heirs of the affectation and conformism, fuel of this monster that dominates Brazilian music, the caetanic establishment. They shifted styles zillions of times (curiously, always embarking on what's being successful) and make a serious pose, in the best Herbert Vianna school of pretension".

He had already expressed dislike for the album in a June 1997 text in which he accused the work of being "artificial" and compared them to pagode group Negritude Júnior, stating the latter had a more rock and roll attitude than the former. He also said: "Now, analyzing Titãs' trajectory (it sucks to talk about them again, but this "unplugged" album is of an abysmal badness, it's hard to escape), we see a band always trying to be what they're not. Raised on little contemplative caetanic music, they already tried new wave, grunge, head, punk and only now, finally, they clearly embraced the pretentious MPB that shaped them.

In a pool involving 870 readers of Folha, however, the majority elected the album, the show and the band as the bests of the year. "Prá Dizer Adeus" was also chosen as the best song.

In August 2018, Lucas Brêda, at Vice magazine, elected Titãs' Acústico as the worst Acústico MTV in a list with 31 of the 33 albums released in Brasil under the project.

Commercial reception 
The album sold 180,000 copies in less than one month, 500,000 until 18 August 1997 and three days later it was already their best-selling album, with 700,000 copies. In October 1997, the one million mark was reached. The album went on to earn a diamond certification and sold over 1,7 million copies - a number that exceeded the label's goal of one million copies, but not manager Manoel Poladian's prediction. He believed the album would sell three million copies.

Album certification

Personnel 
Adapted from the CD booklet:

Titãs 
Branco Mello – lead vocals
Nando Reis – lead vocals, bass, acoustic guitar on "Os Cegos do Castelo"
Sérgio Britto – lead vocals, piano, Hammond organ
Paulo Miklos – lead vocals, mandolin
Marcelo Fromer – acoustic guitar
Tony Bellotto – Acoustic guitar, Twelve-string guitar, slide
Charles Gavin – drums

Guest performances 
 Arnaldo Antunes - lead vocals on "O Pulso"
 Marisa Monte - lead vocals on "Flores"
 Jimmy Cliff - lead vocals on "Querem Meu Sangue (The Harder They Come)"
 Marina Lima - lead vocals on "Cabeça Dinossauro (vinheta)"
 Fito Paez - lead vocals on "Go Back" and piano on "Televisão" (DVD version)
 Rita Lee - lead vocals on "Televisão" (CD version)
 Roberto de Carvalho - piano on "Televisão" (CD version)

Session musicians 
Liminha – acoustic guitar, bass on "Os Cegos do Castelo"
Marcos Suzano – percussion
Antonella "Fievel" Pareschi – Violin
Mariana "Rapunzel" Salles – Violin
Cassia Passaroto – Cello
Maria Flavia Martins – Cello
Cristina Braga – Harp
Flavio de Mello – Trumpet
Vitor Santos – Trombone
Philip Doyle – Horn
José Canuto – Alto Saxophone
Marcelo Martins – Tenor Saxophone
Eduardo Morelenbaum – Bass clarinet

Technical personnel 
 Artistic direction - Paulo Junqueiro
 Base arrangements - Titãs and Liminha
 Strings and brass arrangements - Jaques Morelenbaum, Liminha and Titãs
 Brass arrangements ("Família", "Homem Primata", "Querem Meu Sangue"), brass and strings ("Diversão") - Marcelo Martins, Liminha and Titãs
 Technical direction - Paulo Lima
 Recording engineering - Vitor Farias
 Recording assistants - Marcelo Calvario, Daniel Pires, Breno Gradel, Bruno Leite and Mario Léo
 Additional engineers - Denilson Campos and Alexandre Saggesa
 Mixing: U.M.Q.A. (Unidade Móvel Quiosque do Amor)
 Mixing engineering - Vitor Farias and Liminha
 Mixing assistants - Marcelo "Bro" Calvario, Mario Léo, Breno Gradel and Bruno Leite
 Digital edition - Denilson Campos, Liminha and Titãs
 Mastering engineering - Ricardo Garcia, Magic Master
 Graphic project - Toni Vanzolini, Gualter Pupo and João Bonelli
 Graphic coordination - Silvia Panella
 Photos - Juan Steves, Marcelo Rossi, Mila Maluhy (Rita Lee) and Marcia Ramalho (Marina Lima)
 Production (Titãs) - Nelson Damascena
 Production assistant (Titãs) - Wilson Rosa
 Roadies - Sombra Jones, Sergio Molina, Gerson Molina
 Security - Lauro Silva e Luiz Gomes
 Sound: MacAudio
 P.A. Engineering - Carlos Pedruzzi
 Monitor engineering - Andre Nogueira
 Technician - Edilson Meireles
 P.A. - Paulo Junqueiro
 Light - Marcos Olivio / Spectrum
 Costume design - Ellen Igersheimer
 Scenery - Tom Vanzolini e Gualter Pupo
 Roadies - Liminha e Breno Gradel
 "Cabeça Dinossauro" - recorded at Unidade Móvel Quiosque do Amor, by Vitor Farias and Liminha.
 Assistants - Marcelo "Bro" Calvario and Mário Léo
 "Televisão" - recorded at Artmix, São Paulo, by Antoine Midani
 Assistants - Alexandre Soares, Edgard Popó and Alexandre Russo

Notes

References 

Titãs live albums
Acustico Mtv (Titas album)
Albums produced by Liminha
1997 live albums
Warner Music Group live albums